The Dynamo 9.0 is the ninth-generation car run by DTU Roadrunners to compete in the Urban Concept class in the Shell Eco-marathon Europe. As same as the previous generation of Urban Concept cars developed by students at the Technical University of Denmark, it has the single purpose of achieving the best fuel economy as possible. The Dynamo 9.0 is the current workhorse of the DTU Roadrunners for the said competition.

References

Shell Eco-marathon challengers
Concept cars